The Ferdenrothorn is a mountain of the Bernese Alps, located between Leukerbad and Ferden in the canton of Valais. It lies south of the Balmhorn and overlooks the Lötschen Pass on its north side. Its east side shows well marked folds.

References

External links
 Ferdenrothorn on Hikr

Mountains of the Alps
Alpine three-thousanders
Mountains of Switzerland
Mountains of Valais